Cinco is an unincorporated community in Kanawha County, West Virginia, United States.

The community was named by a mining official, who preferred Cinco brand cigars.

References 

Coal towns in West Virginia
Unincorporated communities in West Virginia
Unincorporated communities in Kanawha County, West Virginia